Camaleona, is a Venezuelan telenovela produced by Carlos Lamus Alcalá for Radio Caracas Televisión in 2007.

Juliet Lima and Daniel Elbittar star as the main protagonists, Dad Dáger, Karl Hoffman and Marianela González star as the main antagonists and Sheyene Gerardi as the villain.

Cast 
Juliet Lima as Natalia Rivas / Elena / María Moñitos
Daniel Elbittar as Juan Pablo Alcántara
Dad Dáger as Claudia Ferrari / Octavia Ferrari
Karl Hoffman as Reynaldo Luzardo
Marianela González as Mercedes Luzardo
Ezequiel Stremiz as Luis Felipe Alcántara
Juan Carlos Alarcón as Leopoldo Tovar y Tovar III
Sheyene Gerardi as Susana Rincón
Marco Antonio Alcalá as Raimundo "Rambó" Borregales
Mayra Alejandra as Amapola "Pola" Rivas
Cayito Aponte as José Ignacio Rivas
Gioia Arismendi as Olga Carolina "Olguita" Luzardo
Relú Cardozo as María Cecilia
Albi De Abreu as Gustavo Casanova
Guillermo García as Ignacio "Iñaqui" Lofiego Rivas
Juan Carlos Gardié as Vittorio "Vitto" Lofiego
Alessandra Guilarte as Sofia
Simón Gómez as Rolito
Crisbel Henriquez as Flor Rivas
Carmen Alicia Lara as Mariángel "Gel" Lofiego Rivas
Romina Fernandes Russa as Esther
Deyalit López as Astrid Hernández
Cesar D' La Torre as Eduardo

References

External links 

2007 telenovelas
2007 Venezuelan television series debuts
2007 Venezuelan television series endings
Spanish-language telenovelas
RCTV telenovelas
Venezuelan telenovelas
Television shows set in Caracas